Ritenbenck, Ritenbenk or Ritenbench is a former settlement on Appat Island in Avannaata municipality in northwestern Greenland. The island is located in the Uummannaq Fjord.

Ritenbenck was founded in 1755 by the General Trade Company. The name was an anagram of the GTC's then-chairman Christian August Berckentin (1694–1758).

See also
 Qaqortuatsiaq, an abandoned marble quarry on the same island

References

Former populated places in Greenland